Nicrophorus bipunctatus may refer to the beetles:

 Nicrophorus germanicus, misidentified in 1880 by Kraatz as a new variant of N. germanicus
 Nicrophorus vestigator, misidentified in 1914 by Portevin as a new variant of N. vestigator